Proeulia kuscheli is a species of moth of the family Tortricidae. It is found in the Desventuradas Islands off the coast of Chile.

The wingspan is about 18 mm. The ground colour of the forewings is olive, without contrasting markings. The hindwings are white, except for olive colouring around the margins.

Etymology
The species is named in honour of Dr. Guillermo Kuschel, who collected the type specimen.

References

Moths described in 1980
Proeulia
Endemic fauna of Chile